The Neuchâtel Crisis (1856–1857) was the result of a diplomatic question between the Swiss Confederation and the King of Prussia regarding the rights of the Royal House of Prussia to the Principality of Neuchâtel. The Principality of Neuchâtel was granted to the King of Prussia in 1707, then was ruled by Napoléon Bonaparte after Frederick William III of Prussia was deposed as Prince of Neuchâtel. In 1814, the Principality was again granted to Frederick William, and the following year he agreed to allow the Principality to join the Swiss Confederation (which was an alliance of semi-independent states rather than a single country) while remaining under his rule.

The Principality successfully revolted against Prussian rule in 1848. In 1849, the Prussian government began to press for recognition of their right to Neuchâtel. Several states proposed that Neuchâtel be separated from but remain allied with the Swiss Confederation. The British government sought to establish a diplomatic agreement, with the support of the French. The King of Prussia continued to press for his rights on the matter.

On September 2–3, 1856, there was a revolt by the Neuchâtel royalists, loyal to the prince, which brought the situation to a crisis point. The revolt failed and the royalists were made hostage. Due to a dispute over releasing the royalist prisoners, Prussia broke off relations with Switzerland on December 13, 1856, and announced an army mobilization. In turn, the Swiss government prepared for war, electing Guillaume Henri Dufour as General, among other actions. War was averted after Napoleon III helped secure the prisoners' release.

Negotiations began between France, the United Kingdom, Prussia and Russia for the future of Neuchâtel, with the United Kingdom strongly supporting the independence of the Principality. This conference took place in 1857. On May 26, 1857, Prussia finally yielded its claim to Neuchâtel at the insistence of the other powers.

References

Canton of Neuchâtel
1856 in Switzerland
1857 in Switzerland
1856 in politics
1857 in politics
Germany–Switzerland relations